The Breaks is an American 1999 comedy film written by and starring Mitch Mullany and directed by Eric Meza.

Plot
A Sunday in the life of Derrick King, an Irish kid raised in Compton, California by a black family. He speaks and dresses in a way that might be called "black" and thinks of himself as a black person. It is a day of disasters: his mom kicks him out of the house, his uncle fires him, the woman he loves dismisses him as childish, the LAPD (wearing Confederate flag shoulder patches) impounds his car and tosses him in the drunk tank, a mean dude is after him for money, he is imprisoned in a store basement by gay sadists, and he is shot at. Along the way, however, he shows kindness to a near-sighted kid, and those random acts may prove to be his salvation. Rappers Xzibit, E-40 and Flesh-n-Bone appear in the film.

The movie features numerous parodies, including one of Pulp Fiction, as well as Good Will Hunting, and an appearance by George Clinton as himself.  Professional basketball player Gary Payton also has a speaking role in the movie.

Cast
Mitch Mullany as Derrick King
Lamont Bentley as Darryl
Carl Anthony Payne II as Chris
Loretta Devine as Floria
Paul Benjamin as Clerk
George Clinton as Himself
Xzibit as Jamal

External links

1999 films
Hood comedy films
1999 comedy films
Films set in Los Angeles
Artisan Entertainment films
1990s English-language films
1990s American films